VGI may refer to:

 Volunteered geographic information
 VGI Global Media, an advertising firm
 Virgin Atlantic International (ICAO airline code: VGI), see List of airlines of the United Kingdom
 Vangani railway station (rail code: VGI), see List of railway stations in India
 VGI, a strain of Cryptococcus
 Voltage-Gated Inactivation, of voltage-gated calcium channel
 Vehicle-Grid Interface, for vehicle-to-grid
 Video Games Indonesia, a gaming community in Indonesia, see video games in Indonesia
 "V.G.I.", a 1997 song by Kathleen Hanna from the album Julie Ruin

See also

 VGL (disambiguation)
 VG1 (disambiguation)
 VG (disambiguation)